The Erbil International Hotel is a luxurious hotel based in Erbil, the capital of the Kurdistan Region. The hotel was constructed and completed in 2004 and is since then the first 5-star hotel in Kurdistan and Iraq by western standards. The hotel is located at the 30 Meter Street, 2 kilometers from the historical citadel of Erbil. The hotel has a good connection to Erbil International Airport by having an Airport Transfer service.

See also 
 Erbil
 Erbil International Airport
 Khanzad Hotel

References 

Hotels in Iraq
Buildings and structures in Erbil
2004 establishments in Iraq
Hotels established in 2004
Hotel buildings completed in 2004